Qaisar Shafi is a Pakistani-American theoretical physicist and the Inaugural Bartol Research Institute Professor of Physics at the University of Delaware.

Biography
Shafi grew up in Karachi, Pakistan and lived there until his early teens when his family moved to London, United Kingdom. After graduating as valedictorian from Holland Park School, London, UK, he studied physics at Imperial College, London, where he received both his B.Sc. Honors and PhD. His PhD advisor was the late Nobel Laureate Professor Abdus Salam, whom he subsequently joined at the International Centre for Theoretical Physics (ICTP) in Trieste, Italy. Shafi was awarded an Alexander von Humboldt Prize and spent some years in Germany (Munich, Aachen, and Freiburg). In 1978, he received his Habilitation with Venia Legendi from the University of Freiburg. He then spent two years at CERN (Geneva, Switzerland) after which he moved to the United States. Since 1983, Shafi has been a faculty member at the Bartol Research Institute, University of Delaware, which in 2005 merged with the Department of Physics and Astronomy.

Shafi has done pioneering research in areas ranging from Grand Unification to Kaluza-Klein theories, to inflationary cosmology and supersymmetric theories, and he is widely regarded as a leader in these fields. He has published more than 300 papers in refereed journals, among them many of the most prestigious in the field, lectured at close to 250 conferences, workshops, and universities.

Research Work
Contemporary high energy physics could be subdivided into the energy frontier, the cosmic frontier and the intensity frontier. Shafi, whose work is highly interdisciplinary, has made pioneering contributions in all three areas.
Shafi’s work has focused on Grand Unified Theories (GUTs), Yukawa coupling unification, dark matter and collider physics, inflationary cosmology, topological defects, thermal inflation, superstring phenomenology and related topics. His pioneering works include:
 Discovery of stable cosmic strings with Sir Tom Kibble and George Lazarides in Grand Unified Theories
 Discovery of discrete Z_2 symmetry in SO (10) with Sir Tom Kibble and George Lazarides. This gauge Z_2 symmetry plays a critical role in explaining why the dark matter in the universe is stable.
 Discovery of topological defects called “walls bounded by strings” with Sir Tom Kibble and George Lazarides. These topological structures were discovered recently in superfluid 3He and are called Kibble-Lazarides-Shafi (KLS) walls.
 Discovery of type II seesaw mechanism with George Lazarides and Christof Wetterich in Grand Unified Theories
 Discovery that axionic strings are superconducting with George Lazarides
 Pioneering paper with George Lazarides on non-thermal leptogenesis in inflationary cosmology
 Discovery of Yukawa unification in supersymmetric GUTs with Balasubramanian Ananthanarayan and George Lazarides
 Novel mechanism (Lazarides-Shafi mechanism) for solving the axion domain wall problem
 D-brane inflation with Giorgi Dvali and Sviatoslav Solganik
 Shafi-Vilenkin Inflationary Model
 Fermion mass hierarchies in five dimensional models with Stephan Huber
 Supersymmetric Hybrid Inflation with Giorgi Dvali and Robert Schaefer

Outreach Work
Shafi has done also extensive outreach work for the scientific community. From the early 1980s until 1997, he organized/co-organized several weeks long summer schools at the International Centre for Theoretical Physics in Trieste. For more than fifteen years, Shafi was one of the key organizers for each summer school.

In addition, he was also one of the principal organizers of the BCVSPIN (acronym denoting the countries Bangladesh-China-Vietnam-Sri Lanka-Pakistan-India-Nepal) schools, which he co-founded in 1989 with Professors Abdus Salam, Jogesh Pati and Yu-Lu. The concept underlying BCVSPIN was to allow young scientists living in underserved regions to engage in research. Professor Shafi organized, lectured at, and led numerous BCVSPIN schools as well as associated preparatory schools, and thus helped lay the groundwork for the successful careers of many graduate students and postdoctoral fellows while also keeping track of their progress. He directed or co-directed the BCVSPIN summer schools from 1989-1997 and after a hiatus of several years, caused by the shifting political climate in Nepal, single-handedly resurrected the school in 2007, organizing highly successful schools in China, Vietnam and also branching out to Mexico.

Personal life
Qaisar Shafi is married to Monika Shafi, the Elias Ahuja Professor Emerita of German Literature at the University of Delaware. They have a daughter and a son.

References

External links 

Alumni of Imperial College London
University of Delaware people
University of Freiburg alumni
Living people
Theoretical physicists
Fellows of the American Physical Society
American Physical Society
English physicists
American academics of Pakistani descent
Year of birth missing (living people)
People associated with CERN